Resorts International Holdings, LLC (RIH), also known as Colony Resorts Holdings (CRH) was an affiliate of Colony NorthStar based in Las Vegas, Nevada.
As of 2005, they were the fifth largest gaming company in America under Nick Ribis. 

RIH was created by Colony Capital (now known as Colony NorthStar) in 2000 after it purchased Resorts Atlantic City from Sun International for $144 million and continued to grow its portfolio through the acquisition of properties that were in decline. Further acquitions in partnership with Colony included the Las Vegas Hilton, Bally's Tunica, Resorts Casino Tunica, Ameristar Casino East Chicago and Atlantic City Hilton.

After selling Resorts East Chicago to Ameristar and losing Resorts Atlantic City in bankruptcy, RIH was in decline. It lost its last casino, the Atlantic Club Casino in bankruptcy in 2014.

References

Holding companies of the United States
Gambling companies of the United States
Hospitality companies of the United States
Privately held companies based in the Las Vegas Valley
Companies established in 2000